In mathematics, the digamma function is defined as the logarithmic derivative of the gamma function:

It is the first of the polygamma functions.

for large arguments in the sector  with some infinitesimally small positive constant .

Relation to harmonic numbers
The gamma function obeys the equation

Taking the derivative with respect to  gives:

or:

Since the harmonic numbers are defined for positive integers  as

the digamma function is related to them by

For half-integer arguments the digamma function takes the values

Integral representations

Combining this expression with an integral identity for the Euler–Mascheroni constant  gives:

The integral is Euler's harmonic number , so the previous formula may also be written

A consequence is the following generalization of the recurrence relation:

An integral representation due to Dirichlet is:

This formula is also a consequence of Binet's first integral for the gamma function.  The integral may be recognized as a Laplace transform.

Infinite product representation
The function  is an entire function, and it can be represented by the infinite product

Note: This is also equal to  due to the definition of the digamma function: .

Series representation

Series formula
Euler's product formula for the gamma function, combined with the functional equation and an identity for the Euler–Mascheroni constant, yields the following expression for the digamma function, valid in the complex plane outside the negative integers (Abramowitz and Stegun 6.3.16):

Equivalently,

Evaluation of sums of rational functions
The above identity can be used to evaluate sums of the form
 

 

For the series to converge,

otherwise the series will be greater than the harmonic series and thus diverge. Hence

and

With the series expansion of higher rank polygamma function a generalized formula can be given as

provided the series on the left converges.

Taylor series
This is

Here,  is the Riemann zeta function. This series is easily derived from the corresponding Taylor's series for the Hurwitz zeta function.

Newton series
The Newton series for the digamma, sometimes referred to as Stern series, reads

where  is the binomial coefficient. It may also be generalized to 

where

Series with Gregory's coefficients, Cauchy numbers and Bernoulli polynomials of the second kind
There exist various series for the digamma containing rational coefficients only for the rational arguments. In particular, the series with Gregory's coefficients   is

 
 
Similar series with the Cauchy numbers of the second kind  reads

A series with the Bernoulli polynomials of the second kind has the following form

where  are the Bernoulli polynomials of the second kind defined by the generating
equation
 
It may be generalized to
 
where the polynomials  are given by the following generating equation
 
so that . Similar expressions with the logarithm of the gamma function involve these formulas
 
and
 

Reflection formula
The digamma function satisfies a reflection formula similar to that of the gamma function:

Recurrence formula and characterization
The digamma function satisfies the recurrence relation

Thus, it can be said to "telescope" , for one has

where  is the forward difference operator. This satisfies the recurrence relation of a partial sum of the harmonic series, thus implying the formula

where  is the Euler–Mascheroni constant.

More generally, one has

Another series expansion is:
, 
where  are the Bernoulli numbers. This series diverges for all  and is known as the Stirling series.

Actually,  is the only solution of the functional equation

This fact follows immediately from the uniqueness of the  function given its recurrence equation and convexity restriction. This implies the useful difference equation:

Some finite sums involving the digamma function
There are numerous finite summation formulas for the digamma function. Basic summation formulas, such as

 

are due to Gauss. More complicated formulas, such as

 

are due to works of certain modern authors (see e.g. Appendix B in Blagouchine (2014)).

We also have

Gauss's digamma theorem

which holds, because of its recurrence equation, for all rational arguments.

Asymptotic expansion
The digamma function has the asymptotic expansion

The first few terms of this expansion are:

Although the infinite sum does not converge for any , any finite partial sum becomes increasingly accurate as  increases.

The expansion can be found by applying the Euler–Maclaurin formula to the sum

The expansion can also be derived from the integral representation coming from Binet's second integral formula for the gamma function.  Expanding  as a geometric series and substituting an integral representation of the Bernoulli numbers leads to the same asymptotic series as above.  Furthermore, expanding only finitely many terms of the series gives a formula with an explicit error term:

Inequalities
When , the function

is completely monotonic and in particular positive. This is a consequence of Bernstein's theorem on monotone functions applied to the integral representation coming from Binet's first integral for the gamma function.

is also completely monotonic.  It follows that, for all ,

This recovers a theorem of Horst Alzer.

where  is the Euler–Mascheroni constant.  The constants appearing in these bounds are the best possible.

The mean value theorem implies the following analog of Gautschi's inequality: If , where  is the unique positive real root of the digamma function, and if , then

Moreover, equality holds if and only if .

Inspired by the harmonic mean value inequality for the classical gamma function, Horzt Alzer and Graham Jameson proved, among other things, a harmonic mean-value inequality for the digamma function:

 for 

Equality holds if and only if .

Computation and approximation
To compute  for small , the recurrence relation

Beal suggests using the above recurrence to shift  to a value greater than 6 and then applying the above expansion with terms above  cut off, which yields "more than enough precision" (at least 12 digits except near the zeroes).

or, for any positive ,

For , we can calculate limits based on the fact that between 1 and 2, so

or

The series matches the overall behaviour well, that is, it behaves asymptotically as it should for large arguments, and has a zero of unbounded multiplicity at the origin too.

(The function is not analytic at infinity.)

This leads to the following asymptotic expansion, which saves computing terms of even order.

Special values
The digamma function has values in closed form for rational numbers, as a result of Gauss's digamma theorem. Some are listed below:

Apart from Gauss's digamma theorem, no such closed formula is known for the real part in general.  We have, for example, at the imaginary unit the numerical approximation

Roots of the digamma function
The roots of the digamma function are the saddle points of the complex-valued gamma function. Thus they lie all on the real axis. All others occur single between the poles on the negative axis:

Already in 1881, Charles Hermite observed that

holds asymptotically. A better approximation of the location of the roots is given by

and using a further term it becomes still better

which both spring off the reflection formula via

and substituting  by its not convergent asymptotic expansion.

Another improvement of Hermite's formula can be given:

Regarding the zeros, the following infinite sum identities were recently proved by István Mező and Michael Hoffman

In general, the function

can be determined and it is studied in detail by the cited authors.

The following results

also hold true.

Here  is the Euler–Mascheroni constant.

Regularization
The digamma function appears in the regularization of divergent integrals

this integral can be approximated by a divergent general Harmonic series, but the following value can be attached to the series

See also
 Polygamma function
 Trigamma function
 Chebyshev expansions of the digamma function in

References

External links
 —psi(1/2)
 psi(1/3),  psi(2/3),  psi(1/4),  psi(3/4),  to  psi(1/5) to psi(4/5).

Gamma and related functions